Jakarta Persistence API (JPA; formerly Java Persistence API) is a Jakarta EE application programming interface specification that describes the management of relational data in enterprise Java applications.

Persistence in this context covers three areas:
 The API itself, defined in the jakarta.persistence package ( for Jakarta EE 8 and below)
 The Jakarta Persistence Query Language (JPQL; formerly Java Persistence Query Language)
 Object/relational metadata

The reference implementation for JPA is EclipseLink.

History 
The final release date of the JPA 1.0 specification was 11 May 2006 as part of Java Community Process JSR 220. The JPA 2.0 specification was released 10 December 2009 (the Java EE 6 platform requires JPA 2.0). The JPA 2.1 specification was released 22 April 2013 (the Java EE 7 platform requires JPA 2.1). The JPA 2.2 specification was released in the summer of 2017. The JPA 3.1 specification, the latest version, was released in the spring of 2022 as part of Jakarta EE 10.

Entities 
A persistence entity is a lightweight Java class with its state typically persisted to a table in a relational database. Instances of such an entity correspond to individual rows in the table. Entities typically have relationships with other entities, and these relationships are expressed through object/relational mapping (ORM) metadata. This metadata may be specified directly in the entity class file by using annotations or in a separate XML descriptor file distributed with the application.

Example 
An example entity class with ORM metadata declared using annotations (import statements and setters/getters are omitted for simplicity).

@Entity
public class Person {
    @Id
    private long id;
    private String firstName;
    private String lastName;
    private int age;
}

The @Entity annotation declares that the class represents an entity. @Id declares the attribute which acts as the primary key of the entity. Additional annotations may be used to declare additional metadata (for example changing the default table name in the @Table annotation), or to create associations between entities.

Query Language 

The Jakarta Persistence Query Language (JPQL; formerly Java Persistence Query Language) makes queries against entities stored in a relational database. Queries resemble SQL queries in syntax but operate against entity objects rather than directly with database tables.

Motivation 
Prior to the introduction of EJB 3.0 specification, many enterprise Java developers used lightweight persistent objects provided by either persistence frameworks (such as Hibernate) or data access objects (DAO) instead of by using entity beans. This is because entity beans, in previous EJB specifications, called for much complicated code and imposed a heavy resource footprint, and they could be used only on Java EE application servers because of interconnections and dependencies in the source code between beans and DAO objects or persistence frameworks. Thus, many of the features originally presented in third-party persistence frameworks were incorporated into the Java Persistence API, and projects such as Hibernate and TopLink Essentials have become implementations of the Java Persistence API specification.

Related technologies

Enterprise Beans 
The EJB 3.0 specification (itself part of the Java EE 5 platform) included a definition of the Java Persistence API. However, developers do not need an EJB container or a Java EE application server to run applications that use this persistence API. Future versions of the Java Persistence API will be defined in a separate JSR and specification rather than in the EJB JSR/specification.

The Java Persistence API replaces the persistence solution of EJB 2.0 CMP (Container-Managed Persistence).

Java Data Objects API 

The Java Persistence API was developed in part to unify the Java Data Objects API and the EJB 2.0 Container Managed Persistence (CMP) API. Most products supporting each of the two APIs support the Java Persistence API.

The Java Persistence API specifies persistence only for relational database management systems by focusing on object-relational mapping (ORM). Some JPA providers support other database models, though this is outside the scope of JPA's design. The introduction section of the JPA specification states: "The technical objective of this work is to provide an object/relational mapping facility for the Java application developer using a Java domain model to manage a relational database."

The Java Data Objects specification supports ORM as well as persistence to other types of database models, for example, flat file databases and NoSQL databases, including document databases, graph databases any many other datastores.

Service Data Object API 

The designers of the Java Persistence API aimed to provide for relational persistence, with many of the key areas taken from object-relational mapping tools such as Hibernate and TopLink. Java Persistence API improved on and replaced EJB 2.0, evidenced by its inclusion in EJB 3.0. The Service Data Objects (SDO) API (JSR 235) has a very different objective to that of the Java Persistence API and is considered  complementary. The SDO API is designed for service-oriented architectures, multiple data formats rather than only relational data and multiple programming languages. The Java Community Process manages the Java version of the SDO API; the C++ version of the SDO API is managed via OASIS.

Hibernate 

Hibernate, founded by Gavin King, provides an open source object-relational mapping framework for Java. Versions 3.2 and later provide an implementation for the Java Persistence API. King represented JBoss on JSR 220, the JCP expert group charged with developing JPA. This led to ongoing controversy and speculation surrounding the relationship between JPA and Hibernate. Sun Microsystems stated that ideas came from several frameworks, including Hibernate and Java Data Objects.

Spring Data JPA  
The Spring Data JPA is an implementation of the repository abstraction that is a key building block of domain-driven design based on the Java application framework Spring. It transparently supports all available JPA implementations and supports CRUD operations as well as the convenient execution of database queries.

Version history

JPA 2.0

Development of a new version of JPA 2.0 was started in July 2007 in the Java Community Process as JSR 317. JPA 2.0 was approved as final on 10 December 2009. The focus of JPA 2.0 was to address features that were present in some of the popular ORM vendors but could not gain consensus approval for JPA 1.0.

Main features included were:
 Expanded object-relational mapping functionality
 Support for collections of embedded objects, linked in the ORM with a many-to-one relationship
 Ordered lists
 Combinations of access types
 A criteria query API
 Standardization of SQL Hints
 Standardization of additional metadata to support DDL generation
 Support for validation
 Shared object cache support.

Vendors supporting JPA 2.0:
 Batoo JPA
 DataNucleus (formerly JPOX)
 EclipseLink (formerly Oracle TopLink)
 IBM, for WebSphere Application Server
 JBoss with Hibernate
 ObjectDB
 OpenJPA
 OrientDB
 Versant Corporation JPA (object database)

JPA 2.1

Development of JPA version 2.1 began in July 2011 as JSR 338. JPA 2.1 was approved as final on 22 May 2013.

Main features included were:
 Converters, which allow custom code conversions between database and object types
 Criteria update/delete to allow bulk updates and deletes through the Criteria API
 Entity graphs for partial or specified fetching or merging of objects.
 JPQL/Criteria enhancements such as arithmetic subqueries, generic database functions, join ON clause and the TREAT option.
 Schema generation
 Support for stored procedures

Vendors supporting JPA 2.1:
 DataNucleus
 EclipseLink
 Hibernate
 OpenJPA (from version 2.2.0)

JPA 2.2

Development of JPA 2.2, a maintenance release, began in 2017 under JSR 338. The maintenance review was approved on 19 June 2017.

Main features included were:
 The addition of @Repeatable to all relevant annotations
 Support for JPA annotations to be used in metaannotations
 Streaming for query results
 The ability for AttributeConverters to be CDI-injectable
 Support for Java 8 date and time types

Vendors supporting JPA 2.2:
 DataNucleus (from version 5.1)
 EclipseLink (from version 2.7)
 Hibernate (from version 5.3)
 OpenJPA (from version 3.0.0)

Jakarta Persistence 3.0

The JPA was renamed as Jakarta Persistence in 2019 and version 3.0 was released in 2020. This included the renaming of packages and properties from javax.persistence to jakarta.persistence.

Vendors supporting Jakarta Persistence 3.0:
 DataNucleus (from version 6.0)
 EclipseLink (from version 3.0)
 Hibernate (from version 5.5)

Jakarta Persistence 3.1

Version 3.1 was released in 2022. It is part of Jakarta EE 10, and thus requires at least Java 11 to run.

Vendors supporting Jakarta Persistence 3.1:
 DataNucleus (from version 6.0)
 EclipseLink (from version 4.0)
 Hibernate (from version 6.0)

See also
 .NET Persistence API (NPA)
 JDBC
 MyBatis
 pureQuery
 SAP NetWeaver Application Server
 XQJ

References

External links

General info
 
 Documentation for the final version of the EJB3 spec (called JSR220)
 GlassFish's Persistence page
 JCP Persistence page

Tutorials
 Java EE 6 Persistence API Javadoc
 Java EE 6 Persistence API tutorial
 Java EE 7 Persistence API Javadoc
 Java EE 7 Persistence API tutorial
 Persistence in the Java EE 5 tutorial

Java APIs
Java enterprise platform
Java specification requests
Object-relational mapping
Persistence